Darius was reportedly launched at Newcastle on Tyne in 1824. She foundered without a trace in February 1829.

Career
Darius first appeared in the Register of Shipping (RS) in 1825. 

In 1813 the British East India Company (EIC), had lost its monopoly on the trade between India and Britain. British ships were then free to sail to India or the Indian Ocean under a licence from the EIC.

Darius, Bowen, master, sailed from London for Bombay on 9 March 1825, sailing under a licence from the EIC.

Darius, T.Blair, master, sailed from London on 11 April 1827, bound for Mauritius.

Darius, j.Hunter, master, sailed from London on 7 May 1828, bound for Ceylon and Bengal.

Loss
On 8 February 1829, Darius, Hunter, master, sailed from Mauritius for London and was not heard from again. A hurricane that occurred or 12 February was believed to have been the cause of the loss.

Citations

References
 

1824 ships
Ships built on the River Tyne
Age of Sail merchant ships of England
Missing ships
Ships lost with all hands
Maritime incidents in February 1829